Krumm is a German surname. Notable people with the surname include:

Al Krumm (1865–1937), Major League Baseball pitcher
Franz Krumm (1909–1943), German footballer
Michael Krumm (born 1970), German auto racing driver
Philip Krumm (born 1941), American composer
Piret Krumm (born 1989), Estonian actress, singer, and comedian 
Tracy Krumm, American textile artist

See also
Aaahh!!! Real Monsters, fictional Nickelodeon character
Krumm (river)
Kimiko Date-Krumm, Japanese tennis player
Arnold Krumm-Heller (1876–1949), German doctor, occultist, and Rosicrucian
Krum (disambiguation)

German-language surnames
Estonian-language surnames